The 1979–80 Southern Football League season was the 77th in the history of the league, an English football competition.

At the end of the previous season the Alliance Premier League was established as a new, national top division of non-League football. Thirteen clubs from the Premier Division joined the new league, leading to a restructuring of the Southern League for this season, in which it was divided solely into Midland and Southern divisions. Bridgend Town won the Midland Division, whilst Dorchester Town won the Southern Division. Bridgend were declared Southern League champions after defeating Dorchester 3–0 at home and 2–1 away to win a championship play-off. There was no promotion to the Alliance Premier League and no relegation to feeder leagues.

Midland Division
At the end of the previous season Alliance Premier League on the top of non-league was created. Following that Southern Football League was restructured with Midland and Southern divisions replacing three old divisions. The Midland Division consisted of 22 clubs, including 16 clubs from the previous season Division One North and six new clubs:
Three clubs from the Premier Division:
Bridgend Town
Cheltenham Town
Witney Town

Three clubs from Division One South:
Minehead
Trowbridge Town
Taunton Town

League table

Southern Division
At the end of the previous season Alliance Premier League on the top of non-league was created. Following that Southern Football League was restructured with Midland and Southern divisions replacing three old divisions. The Southern Division consisted of 24 clubs, including 18 clubs from the previous season Division One South and six new clubs:
Five clubs from the Premier Division:
Dartford
Dorchester Town
Hastings United
Hillingdon Borough
Margate

Plus:
Fareham Town, joined from the Hampshire League

At the end of the season Addlestone was renamed Addlestone & Weybridge Town and Folkestone and Shepway was renamed Folkestone.

League table

See also
 Southern Football League
 1979–80 Isthmian League
 1979–80 Northern Premier League

References

Southern Football League seasons
6